Philgamia is a genus of flowering plants belonging to the family Malpighiaceae.

Its native range is Madagascar.

Species:

Philgamia brachystemon 
Philgamia denticulata 
Philgamia glabrifolia 
Philgamia hibbertioides

References

Malpighiaceae
Malpighiaceae genera